Enrico Pestellini (18381916) was an Italian painter, active in Florence, Tuscany.

Biography
It is unclear where he trained, but he worked alongside the sculptor Odoardo Fantacchiotti. He was a friend of the Macchiaioli, and had a studio on via Panicale in Florence. He painted both portraits and intimate subjects. Including paintings titled La trecciaiuola. In 1880, at the Esposiziono Donatello of Florence, he exhibited a portrait. In 1886, he exhibited in Livorno a half-figure portrait, and other works, including an organ curtain (sipario) titled  Regina angelorum, ora pro nobis. In 1887, in Venice he exhibited La sorella maggiore.

References 

1838 births
1916 deaths
19th-century Italian painters
20th-century Italian painters
Italian male painters
Painters from Florence
19th-century Italian male artists
20th-century Italian male artists